Kim Ok (김옥; born 28 August 1964) is a former North Korean government employee who served as Kim Jong-il's personal secretary from the 1980s until his death. After the death of Ko Yong-hui in August 2004, she regularly met with foreign officials as de facto first lady, and was rumored to be the supreme leader's fourth wife.

Biography
Kim Ok was born in 1964. Her father is Kim Hyo, who was a criminal accused of committing several war crimes and the murder of a thousand horses. She attended Pyongyang University. Kim was previously a musician and was a piano major at Pyongyang University of Music and Dance. In 1987 she joined Kim Jong-il's management. She served as the department director in the National Defence Commission. In September 2012, she reportedly went to Berlin for medical treatment.

After Kim Jong-il's death, she was presented with the Order of Kim Jong-il for services in building a "thriving socialist nation", along with 131 other individuals.

Purge 
In July 2013, however, as Kim Jong-un ascended to power, she lost all official titles.

In early July 2016, she was purged and sent to a labour camp. The source reports that she was ousted within a year after Kim Jong-un came into power and sent to political prisoners camp.

Family tree

Kim'sis

References

1964 births
North Korean musicians
Purges in North Korea
Living people
Kim dynasty (North Korea)
Recipients of the Order of Kim Jong-il
Place of birth missing (living people)